James Jebbia (born July 22, 1963) is an American-British businessman, fashion designer and former child actor. He is known for being the founder of the skateboarding shop and clothing brand Supreme.

Early life
James Jebbia was born on July 22, 1963, in the United States. His American father was formerly in the United States Air Force, and his English mother is a former teacher. His parents divorced when he was around 10 years old.

At one years old, Jebbia's parents relocated from the U.S. to Crawley, West Sussex in the United Kingdom. In 1983, Jebbia moved back to the United States when he was 19 years old, settling in Staten Island, New York City.

Career

In the late 1970s Jebbia worked as a child actor including appearing in the first series of Grange Hill as Tommy Watson.

In 1983, Jebbia's first job in New York was at Parachute, a minimalist skate shop and clothing store located in SoHo, Manhattan.

In 1989, he managed the streetwear store, Union NYC, which carried a mix of mostly English clothing brands. Its first store opened in 1989 on Spring Street in Manhattan, and later closed in 2009. From 1991 to 1994, he partnered with Shawn Stussy, the founder of the clothing brand, Stüssy.

In 1994, Jebbia founded the clothing brand and skateboarding shop Supreme, and opened its first store on Lafayette Street in Manhattan. Among his earliest designs was a cut-and-sew pair of tiger-stripe cargo pants. As of 2021, Supreme has 14 locations worldwide, one each in New York City, Brooklyn, Chicago, San Francisco, Los Angeles, London, Paris, Milan, and six in Japan (Harajuku, Shibuya, Daikanyama, Nagoya, Osaka, and Fukuoka).

In 2017, Supreme collaborated with Louis Vuitton, with their debut collection unveiled during Paris Fashion Week.

Jebbia has collaborated with high-profile artists, such as Damien Hirst, Takashi Murakami and Richard Prince.

Personal life
Jebbia is married to Bianca Jebbia and has two children. He resides in Lower Manhattan's West Village in New York City.

References

External link
 

Living people
1963 births
British fashion designers
High fashion brands
21st-century English businesspeople
English businesspeople in fashion
English businesspeople in retailing
21st-century American businesspeople
American businesspeople in retailing
People from Greenwich Village
People from Staten Island